Andoni Aranaga Azkune (born January 1, 1979) is a Spanish former professional road bicycle racer, who rode professionally between 2004 and 2007 for the , Kaiku and  teams. Aranaga won stages in the Vuelta a Asturias and the Volta a la Comunitat Valenciana in 2005.

Major results

1997
 2nd Road race, National Junior Road Championships
2005
 1st Stage 2 Vuelta a Asturias
 1st Stage 3 Volta a la Comunitat Valenciana
2006
 9th Circuito de Getxo

External links 
Team Profile 

1979 births
Living people
People from Azpeitia
Cyclists from the Basque Country (autonomous community)
Spanish male cyclists
Sportspeople from Gipuzkoa